The Place des Émeutes-de-Stonewall is a public square in Paris, France.

History 
For the 50th anniversary of the Stonewall Riots, the City of Paris named a square to pay homage to the riots.
The new square was inaugurated by French officials on 19 June, with Stuart Milk and several Stonewall Inn activists.

The square is the main entrance of Italian delicatessen Eataly. A Gucci boutique is also situated there.

French memorial to Gilbert Baker
The official plaque in memory of Gilbert Baker, voted unanimously by the Council of Paris, is situated on a wall of the square.

See also

 Gilbert Baker (artist)
 Le Marais
 Stonewall Riots
 Place Harvey Milk
 LGBT culture in Paris

References

External links
 
 
 

Squares in Paris
Tourist attractions in Paris
Le Marais